The discography of American indie pop band Foster the People consists of three studio albums, five extended plays (including one mixtape), 26 singles, and 15 music videos.

Mark Foster founded the band in 2009 after spending several years in Los Angeles as a struggling musician and working as a commercial jingle writer. After Foster's song "Pumped Up Kicks" became a viral success in 2010, the group was signed to Columbia Records imprint Startime International and gained a fanbase through small club shows and appearances at the music festivals Coachella and South by Southwest. After releasing their debut album Torches in May 2011, "Pumped Up Kicks" became a crossover hit on commercial radio, reaching number one on the Billboard Alternative Songs chart and number 3 on the Billboard Hot 100, while also becoming successful in international markets. The success of "Pumped Up Kicks" also propelled Torches to number 8 on the Billboard 200 chart. Four other singles were released from the album, including "Helena Beat", "Don't Stop (Color on the Walls)", and "Houdini", all of which entered the Alternative Songs chart.

Albums

Studio albums

Re-issued albums

Extended plays

Mixtapes

Singles

As lead artist

As featured artist

Promotional singles

Remixes

Other appearances

Guest appearances

Interpolations

Songs

Bonus tracks

Side projects

Covers

Music videos

Notes

References

External links
 Official website
 Foster the People at AllMusic
 
 

Discographies of American artists
Alternative rock discographies